Bacchisa borneotica is a species of beetle in the family Cerambycidae. It was described by Breuning in 1956. It is known from Borneo.

References

B
Beetles described in 1956